Jobst of Moravia ( or Jošt Lucemburský;  or Jodokus von Mähren;  – 18 January 1411), a member of the House of Luxembourg, was Margrave of Moravia from 1375, Duke of Luxembourg and Elector of Brandenburg from 1388 as well as elected King of Germany (King of the Romans) from 1410 until his death. Jobst was an ambitious and versatile ruler, who in the early 15th century dominated the ongoing struggles within the Luxembourg dynasty and around the German throne.

Life 

Jobst was presumably born in 1354 in the Moravian residence of Brno, the eldest legitimate son of Margrave John Henry, younger brother of Emperor Charles IV. Wenceslaus IV of Bohemia and his half-brother Sigismund were both Jobst's cousins.

Designated heir upon his father's death in 1375, he ruled the Margraviate of Moravia, and would often quarrel with his younger brother Prokop and the Bishops of Olomouc. In 1388, Jobst received the Duchy of Luxembourg, given in pawn by his cousin King Wenceslaus, son of the late Emperor Charles IV. The same year, Jobst also became Prince-elector of Brandenburg, pawned by Sigismund, who focused on his rule over the Kingdom of Hungary. In 1394, Jobst joined the League of Lords, a rebellion of Bohemian nobles around Boček II of Poděbrady against Wenceslaus. He had Wenceslaus arrested at Prague Castle and later taken into custody by the Austrian Starhemberg dynasty at Wildberg. Peace was made at the instigation of Wenceslaus' brothers Sigismund and John of Görlitz; however, once released, the king had Jobst expelled from Prague. Sigismund and Jobst signed a mutual inheritance treaty in 1401, but later again fell out with each other.

After the death of King Rupert of Germany in 1410, Jobst was elected successor by four of the seven prince-electors on 1 October, opposing his cousin Sigismund who had already been elected by three electors on 10 September. The deciding vote came from his cousin Wenceslaus in his capacity as King of Bohemia. Though Jobst had the greater support among the electors, he died on 18 January 1411, possibly having been poisoned, which cleared the way for Sigismund's election as King of the Romans and his later coronation as Holy Roman Emperor.

Marriage and issue 
Jobst married twice, without issue:
 Elisabeth of Opole (1360–1374), daughter of Duke Władysław Opolczyk, in 1372.
 Agnes of Opole (d. 1409), daughter of Duke Bolesław (Bolko) II of Opole and sister of Duke Władysław, in 1374.

Titles 
 King of the Romans
 Margrave of Moravia, Lusatia and Brandenburg
 Elector of Brandenburg
 Duke of Luxembourg
 Vicarius of Italy
 Vicarius of the Holy Roman Empire

In popular culture
A fictionalized Jobst appears in the 2018 video game Kingdom Come: Deliverance. In the game, he is shown with  Divish of Talmberg, Hans Capon, Hanush of Leipa, John II of Liechtenstein, and Radzig Kobyla planning on how to defeat Sigismund and free Wenceslaus from captivity.

References

Further reading

 Štěpán, Václav (2002). Moravsky markrabě Jošt (1354–1411). Matice moravská (in Czech) p. 823. 
 Štěpán, Václav (2000). Margrave Jobst - his personality and relationship with the other members of the Luxembourg family, in:Moravští Lucemburkové 1315–1411. Brno municipal museum (in Czech - short abstract English) pp. 73–145.

External links

1350s births
1411 deaths

Year of birth uncertain
15th-century Kings of the Romans
Margraves of Moravia
Jobst
Jobst
Jobst
Burials at the Church of St. Thomas (Brno)
15th-century people of the Holy Roman Empire